Tomás "Tommy" Joseph Harris (10 April 1908 – 27 January 1964) was a Spanish-speaking MI6 officer who worked with Juan Pujol García, an important double agent for the British during World War II, in what became known as the Garbo deception.

Born of a Spanish mother, Enriqueta Rodriguez, and an English father, Lionel Harris, an art dealer specialising in Spanish paintings, he grew up in a Jewish household in Hampstead, his mother having converted to Judaism at the time of the marriage, Harris continued his father's successful art dealing business, and was essentially an amateur artist himself.  Harris had an important collection of Spanish prints, especially those of Goya, which was mostly acquired by the British Museum after his death. In fact, Harris, while still alive, had placed his collection on indefinite loan in the British Museum. The British Museum has 708 objects formerly in his collection, including 22 prints he made himself, and in 1981 published Juliet Wilson Bareau's, Goya's Prints, The Tomás Harris Collection in the British Museum.

He had five siblings: William, Morris, Violeta, Conchita, and Enriqueta Harris (1910—2006), an art historian specializing in Spanish art.

Possible double agent 
In 1962, Flora Solomon – a friend of Kim Philby – told Victor Rothschild, who had worked with MI6 during World War II, that she thought that Philby and Tomás Harris had been Soviet spies, since the 1930s. "Those two were so close as to give me an intuitive feeling that Harris was more than a friend."

As a result of this information, MI5 sought to interview Harris. However,  Harris was killed in a motor accident at Llucmajor, Mallorca, before an interview could occur. It has been suggested that Harris was murdered. For example, Chapman Pincher suggested that Harris was killed by Soviet agents to prevent him speaking to MI5:  Pincher pointed out that the most likely source of any leak was Roger Hollis, then director-general of MI5 who Pincher controversially claimed was a Soviet agent.

According to Bill Bristow, Tomas Harris's godson, his father, Desmond Bristow, was a very close friend of Tomas Harris and interviewed Juan Pujol (Garbo) before Tommy became Garbo's case officer. He reveals the fact that Tomas Harris funded Philby's book, which he never wrote. Bill Bristow believes Tommy would have known Philby was a KGB operative but was never involved himself, although it was possible.

In a letter dated 8/September/1981 from Brian Sewell to Dick Brewis, Brian Sewell wrote:

“I had a very long and confidential conversation with an old friend and contemporary of Tomas H last night. It seems clear that TH was involved in espionage, but for the Americans and not the Russians: at his death MI5 managed to suppress information about work done specifically for Eisenhower details of which were know to one particular obit writer.”

The “old friend” was probably Anthony Blunt.

Harris and Pujol 
Together they made up a fictional team of 27 fake sub-agents, who were created in order to convince German intelligence that Garbo was a reliable spy. This resulted in what became known as the Garbo deception.

Pujol's and Tomás' network of fictitious agents

References

Bibliography

External links 
 MI5 Profile (archived)
www.tomasharris.com More information about the life of Tomas Harris (family site)

1908 births
1964 deaths
Secret Intelligence Service personnel
People from Hampstead
Road incident deaths in Spain
British art collectors
Art dealers from London
20th-century English businesspeople